Adam August Müller (16 August 1811 – 15 March 1844), a Danish history painter, was one of Eckersberg's favourite students. Generally unhealthy and dead at 32, his work is recognized as an important component in Danish art. His favourite subjects were historical and religious themes.

Biography
A son of Bishop Peter Erasmus Müller (1776-1834), he was born in Copenhagen. In 1825, he became a student of Christoffer Wilhelm Eckersberg (1783–  1853) at the Royal Danish Academy of Fine Arts, joining the Model School in 1828. The following year, he exhibited  ("Aladdin, standing behind a pillar, sees Gulnare") and the following year exhibited a number of portraits, two of which were purchased for the Royal Collection.

He was awarded a silver medal in 1833 and the gold medal in 1836.

In 1838, he competed with Heinrich Eddelien for a scholarship to Italy. Eddelein prevailed but, thanks to the intercession of Bertel Thorvaldsen, Müller received some travel money as well. In 1839, he went to Italy after a short stay in Munich. His studies of Florentine painting encouraged him to adopt a new approach to religious painting, emulating the old Italian style. This earned him the Thorvaldsen Medal for "Christ Blesses the Four Evangelists", painted in 1843 after he had returned to Denmark.

He had only just recovered from a serious illness when he went to Italy and was frequently ill while there. After his return to Copenhagen, his health deteriorated and he died there, leaving several unfinished commissions.

Selected works

 (1829)
 (1831)
 (1832)
 (1832)
 (1833)
 (1834)
, altarpiece (1834)
 (1835)
 (1836)
 (1838)
 (1838)
 (1842)
 (1843)

Gallery

References

External links
 
 More works by Müller @ ArtNet

1811 births
1844 deaths
Artists from Copenhagen
Royal Danish Academy of Fine Arts alumni
19th-century Danish painters
Danish male painters
19th-century painters of historical subjects
19th-century Danish male artists